Muhammad Siraj Ali (born 24 November 1954) is a Bangladeshi-born British restaurateur and philanthropist.

Career
In 1979, Ali bought the New Curry Centre, in Stanford-le-Hope. At the time Ali's family was the first Bengali family in Thurrock Essex.

Ali runs the Maharaja restaurant in South Benfleet, Essex. Since 1991, the restaurant has held charity nights raising close to £2 million for hundreds of charitable causes including; Multiple Sclerosis Society, NSPCC, British Red Cross and Breast Cancer Awareness amongst others. Ali has been involved in the Indian catering industry since the 1970s, with a career spanning 40 years.

Ali is the founder chairman of both the Thurrock Bangladesh Welfare Association and the Thurrock Islamic Educational Cultural Centre. He is the general secretary of the Castle Point Bangladeshi Education and Cultural Centre, as well as governor of the Hajji Soyed Ali Primary School and the chairman of the advisory committee of the Essex Bangladesh Welfare Association.

He is chairman of the Interim Committee Arbitrator and former treasurer of the Balagonj Education Trust, which aims to provide life skills and education to disadvantaged children in Bangladesh. He is also vice-chairman of The Bangladeshi Catering Association (Essex region).

Awards and recognition
In 2009, Ali won the Channel S Award for years of charity work in south Essex. In 2011, he was awarded the British Bangladeshi Who's Who 'Outstanding Contribution' Award for his long standing contribution to the hospitality and catering industry.

In 2009, Ali was the joint winner of the Bangladesh Caterers Association 'Caterer of the Year' for the South East. In 2015, he was awarded the Lifetime Achievement Award by Curry Life magazine.

Personal life
Ali lives in Stanford-le-Hope, Essex. He is married to Begum Momtaj Khanom, and they have one son, Ansar, and three daughters, Shahena (who is a celebrity television chef on The Food Channel) Shareena and Jasmine.

Ali has arranged around 200 charity events per year for 20 years, raising around £600 to £1,500 an event. It is estimated that he has helped raise £3 million for charity.

See also
 British Bangladeshi
 Business of British Bangladeshis
 List of British Bangladeshis

References

External links
 Maharaja Restaurant website
 The Maharaja Wins Parliamentary Restaurant Award from Ainsley Harriott and Rt Hon Keith Vaz MP. Ethnic Now. 24 July 2007

1954 births
Living people
Bangladeshi emigrants to the United Kingdom
British restaurateurs
Bangladeshi businesspeople
British philanthropists
School governors
People from Stanford-le-Hope